Caledonian Maritime Assets Limited (usually shortened to CMAL or CMAssets; Stòras Mara Cailleannach Earr in Scottish Gaelic) owns the ferries, ports, harbours and infrastructure for the ferry services serving the west coast of Scotland, the Firth of Clyde and the Northern Isles.

CMAL is a wholly owned public corporation of the Scottish Government, with Scottish ministers as sole shareholders.

History
Until 1 October 2006 Caledonian MacBrayne Ltd, which was wholly owned by the Scottish government, provided the majority of the Clyde and Hebrides ferry services and owned the associated vessels and a number of the ports and harbour facilities that the vessels used. These services required an annual revenue deficit grant from the then Scottish Executive to maintain lifeline service levels.

To comply with European guidelines on State Aids in Maritime Transport, an open public tender was deemed necessary in respect of these ferry services and the Clyde and Hebrides Ferry Services (CHFS) was tendered as a single bundle, with the exception of the Gourock-Dunoon service.

In recognition of the uniqueness of the fleet and to ensure a level playing field for all bidders, on 1 October 2006 Caledonian MacBrayne Ltd was split into:

 An asset-owning company, Caledonian Maritime Assets Ltd (CMAL)
 A new operating company, CalMac Ferries Ltd (CFL).

This was done by Caledonian MacBrayne Ltd transferring its operations—but not its assets—to CFL. The operation of the lifeline ferry service was then put out to open competitive tender.

CMAL now owns all vessels, the majority of land based assets (ports, harbours etc.) and the Caledonian MacBrayne brand, and makes them available to an operator through an open tendering process. CFL continues to operate the services after winning the tendering process and holds the Public Services Contract (PSC) until 30 September 2013. Under the terms of the tender CFL is bound to use the vessels of CMAL.

Business
CMAL's responsibilities include:
 Maintaining, improving and enhancing assets such as vessels and the land and property around piers and harbours
 Seeking extra investment to invest in ferries and harbour facilities
 Working with stakeholders within Scotland and the wider maritime community to be acknowledged as the principal provider of the most cost-effective, innovative ferries and port infrastructure to the benefit of local communities

Ferries

CMAL currently owns 39 ferries, of which 34 are operated by Calmac Ferries on routes to the islands and peninsulas of the west of Scotland. In April 2018 it was agreed that the five vessels operated by NorthLink Ferries on routes to the Orkney and Shetland islands would also join the fleet. Many ferries are specially built for the ports they serve yet are still interchangeable and able to serve different crossings and can carry from one to 143 cars. The total fleet value was estimated at £130m in 2017.

 and  ceased operation with Caledonian MacBrayne in early 2018, and are now no longer part of the fleet.

Hebridean and Clyde ferries (Caledonian MacBrayne)

Northern Isles ferries (NorthLink Ferries)

Harbours

CMAL is Harbour Authority at 24 locations across Scotland and owns the associated port infrastructure and properties at each of these locations. Additionally, CMAL owns and leases a number of properties at various locations associated with the delivery of Clyde and Hebrides Ferry Services.

As Statutory Harbour Authority for a number of these harbours, CMAL's responsibilities and duties include:
 A duty of care to all port users
 An obligation to conserve and promote the safe use of the harbours
 Responsibility for efficiency, economy and safety of operation, in respect of the services and facilities provided.

Completed projects

Hybrid ferries project – On 17 December 2012, the world's first seagoing roll-on/roll-off vehicle and passenger diesel–electric hybrid ferry was launched by CMAL on the Clyde.  incorporates a low-carbon hybrid system of diesel electric and lithium-ion battery power. The 135-tonne ferry is nearly 150 feet long and can accommodate 150 passengers, 23 cars or two heavy-goods vehicles. She came into service between Skye and Raasay in the summer of 2013. A second hybrid ferry, was launched in May 2013 and operates on the Tarbert-Portavadie route. A third, to be named , was launched in spring 2016.

Brodick terminal redevelopment – CMAL completed the redevelopment of Brodick ferry terminal. The redevelopment included an entirely new pier with linkspan and airbridge, a second berth with concrete ramp, a new two-storey terminal building with bus station and car marshalling space. The old linkspan was removed and the causeway transformed into an outdoor seating area.

Current projects
Sustainable ferries study – CMAL was commissioned to carry out a feasibility study for Scottish Enterprise to evaluate the technical and commercial possibilities of using hydrogen fuel cells to enable the development of zero-emission ferries. Along with Orkney Islands Council, Ballard Power Systems, Kongsberg Maritime and others, CMAL are part of the HySeas III consortium hoping to demonstrate that fuel cells can be integrated with a marine hybrid electric drive system. The project hopes to develop a vessel to operate between Kirkwall and Shapinsay.

Dual-fuel ferries – in September 2015, it was announced that CMAL would order two ferries from Ferguson Marine Engineering (FMEL). The vessels will be able to operate on liquefied natural gas (LNG) and marine diesel, future-proofing them for tighter sulphur emissions regulations. They will be the largest commercial vessels to be built on the Clyde since 2001. The first, named , was due to enter service at Ardrossan in 2018, with the second yet to be named by online vote following a few months later. Both vessels have been delayed, with the shipyard going into administration in August 2019. The 'ferry fiasco' is an ongoing political scandal in Scotland, exposing management failures across all parties involved.

LNG facilities – at Uig and Ardrossan for the dual-fuel vessels under construction.

CMAL's corporate plan includes ambitious proposals to modernise the fleet which could see 18 new ships either delivered or on order and widespread work on pier and port infrastructure by 2024.

Small vessel replacement programme – to replace the oldest of the Loch class, in two phases over ten years. The new vessels would be more environmentally friendly and meet higher regulatory standards.

New Islay ferry – to replace ; the order to have an option for a second vessel.

Gourock – replacements for the passenger-only fleet serving Dunoon and Kilcreggan.

Future major vessel 1/2 – 'design project' phase for two major units.

Northern Isles freight – 'design stage' for two vessels, possibly with some passenger capacity.

Footnotes

References
 Clyde Pleasure Steamers – Ian McCrorie, Orr, Pollock & Co. Ltd., Greenock, 
 Steamers of the Highlands and Islands – Ian McCrorie, Orr, Pollock & Co. Ltd., Greenock, 
 To the Coast: One Hundred Years of the Caledonian Steam Packet Co. – Ian McCrorie, Fairlie Press, Fairlie 1989, 
 The Kingdom of MacBrayne – Nick S. Robins and Donald E. Meek, Birlinn Ltd, Edinburgh 2006, 
 Days At The Coast – Robert Preston, Stenlake Publishing, Ochiltree 1994,

External links
 Official Homepage
 Caledonian MacBrayne Official Homepage

Public corporations of the Scottish Government
Highlands and Islands of Scotland
Companies based in Inverclyde
2006 establishments in Scotland
Transport companies established in 2006
Water transport in Scotland